Celso Míguez Pereira (born 1 May 1982 in Pontevedra, Galicia) is a Spanish racing driver. He has competed in such series as Formula Renault 3.5 Series, World Series Lights and Euroseries 3000. He was runner-up to Bruno Méndez in the 2009 European F3 Open season and collected five wins over the course of the races.

Racing record

Career summary

Complete Formula Renault 3.5 Series results
(key)

† Driver did not finish the race, but was classified as he completed more than 90% of the race distance.

Notes

External links
 Official website
 Career statistics from Driver Database

1982 births
Living people
Spanish racing drivers
Formule Campus Renault Elf drivers
Euroformula Open Championship drivers
Auto GP drivers
World Series Formula V8 3.5 drivers
Drivex drivers
Comtec Racing drivers
Pons Racing drivers
EuroInternational drivers
RP Motorsport drivers
Graff Racing drivers